Patricia Kempthorne (born November 1, 1953) was the First Lady of Idaho from 1999 to 2006 as the wife of Governor Dirk Kempthorne. As first lady she was active in issues affecting children and families in Idaho and took the lead in assisting state government with children's policy. She is a former First Lady of Boise, Idaho (1986–1993).

In March 2006, President George W. Bush nominated Governor Kempthorne to be the United States Secretary of the Interior. After his confirmation by the U.S. Senate on May 26, 2006, she ceased to be the state's first lady. She was scheduled to give up the role in January 2007, as her husband was not seeking reelection to a third term. She was replaced by Vicki Risch, the wife of Governor Jim Risch, who succeeded Kempthorne.

References

First Ladies and Gentlemen of Idaho
Living people
1950 births